The President's Cup is an annual one-off game, featuring two selected clubs at the end of the season. The cup is called the GHALCA President's Cup because it is organized by Ghana League Clubs Association (GHALCA) and played in honour of the sitting President of Ghana. The game was also known as the Republic Day Celebrations Cup and is usually played in July of each year to mark Ghana's Republic Day celebrations which falls on the 1 July.

The current holders are Accra Hearts of Oak, who defeated rivals Asante Kotoko 1–0 in the 2023 match.Asante Kotoko holds the record for most wins with eight titles.

History 
Between 1969 and 1984, the cup was being played to honour the sitting president but was branded based on the sitting president at the time. The 1969 edition was known as the Busia Cup in honour of the then Prime Minister Abrefa Busia whilst the 1973 edition was known as the Acheampong Cup in honour of then head of state Ignatius Kutu Acheampong.

In 2003, after long layoff to the competition from 1985 to 2002, the competition was rebranded as the President's Cup and was instituted through the Ghana League Clubs Association and the National Sports Authority to serve a competition to honour the sitting president on every Republic Day Celebration. The first edition was played between Hearts of Oak and rivals Great Olympics, which Hearts won by 2–0.

List of finals 
Source:

Performance by club

See also 

 Football in Ghana
 Ghana Premier League
 Ghana FA Cup

References

External links 

Football cup competitions in Ghana
Recurring sporting events established in 2003
2003 establishments in Ghana